Uličské Krivé is a village and municipality in Snina District in the Prešov Region of north-eastern Slovakia. In historical records the village was first mentioned in 1478. The municipality lies at an altitude of 285 metres and covers an area of 19.132 km2. According to the 2013 census it had a population of 255 inhabitants.

The village is situated in the buffer zone of the Poloniny National Park and offers an access point to some of the National Park's hiking trails. Several components of the Primeval Beech Forests of the Carpathians UNESCO World Heritage Site are also close to the village.

The wooden Greek Catholic church in the village dates back to 1718 and is dedicated to the Archangel Michael.

References

External links
 
 
Wooden Churches in Slovakia

Villages and municipalities in Snina District
Zemplín (region)